Robert Macgeorge may refer to:

 Robert MacGeorge (1808–1884), Anglican priest and author
 Robert Forsyth Macgeorge (1796–1859), early settler of South Australia